Philippine literature is literature associated with the Philippines from prehistory, through its colonial legacies, and on to the present. 

Pre-Hispanic Philippine literature was actually epics passed on from generation to generation, originally through an oral tradition. However, wealthy families, especially in Mindanao, were able to keep transcribed copies of these epics as family heirloom. One such was the Darangen, an epic of the Maranaos.

Classical literature in Philippines during the 19th Century 

On December 1, 1846, the first daily newspaper, La Esperanza, was published in the country. Other early newspapers were La Estrella (1847), Diario de Manila (1848) and Boletin Oficial de Filipinas (1852). The first provincial newspaper was El Eco de Vigan (1884), which was issued in Ilocos. In Cebu City, El Boleaetín de Cebú (The Bulletin of Cebu) was published in 1890.

On 1863, the Spanish government introduced a system of free public education that increased the population's ability to read Spanish and thereby furthered the rise of an educated class called the Ilustrado (meaning, well-informed). Spanish became the social language of urban places and the true lingua franca of the archipelago. A good number of Spanish newspapers were published until the end of the 1940s, the most influential of them being El Renacimiento, printed in Manila by members of the Guerrero de Ermita family.

Some members of the ilustrado group, while in Spain, decided to start a Spanish publication with the aim of promoting the autonomy and independence projects. Members of this group included Pedro Alejandro Paterno, who wrote the novel Nínay (first novel written by a Filipino) and the Philippine national hero, José Rizal, who wrote excellent poetry and his two famous novels in Spanish: Noli Me Tángere (Touch Me Not), and El Filibusterismo.

Especially potent was La Solidaridad, more fondly called La Sol by the members of the propaganda movement, founded on 15 February 1885.  With the help of this paper, Filipino national heroes like José Rizal, Graciano Lopez Jaena, and Marcelo H. del Pilar were able to voice out their sentiments.

Poetry and metrical romances 
 Tanaga - Short poems consisting of four lines with seven syllables each that rhyme at the end of each line.
 Ladino Poems – Were natives of first Tagalog versifiers who saw print: highly literate in both Spanish and the vernacular.
 Corridos – Were widely read during the Spanish period that filled the populace's need for entertainment as well as edifying reading matter in their leisure moments.
 Awit – like corridos, these were also widely read during the Spanish period as entertaining, edifying, reading manner in their leisure time. It is also a fabrication of the writers imagination although the characters and the setting may be European. The structure is rendered dodecasyllabic quatrains.

Prose 

The prose works of the Spanish Period consisted mostly of didactic pieces and translations of religious writings in foreign languages.

Dramas

Religious 
 Moriones – Refers to the helmets of participants dressed as Roman soldiers, their identities hidden behind colorful, sometimes grotesque, wooden masks. Found only on the island of Marinduque, it is down during Holy Week, culminating in a Passion play that adds the scene of Saint Longinus' conversion and martyrdom.
 Panunuluyan– the Tagalog version of the Mexican Las Posadas, and literally means "seeking passage". Held during Christmastime but especially on Christmas Eve, it depicts Joseph and Mary' search for room at the inn in Bethlehem. The actors playing the Holy Couple chant their pleas for lodging in slow, mournful tones, while the innkeepers and householders would drive them away with haughty verses sang in dance-like metre.
 Pangangaluwa – A practice formerly widespread during All Saints' Day which literally means for the soul[s], it is analogous to the now-defunct English custom of Souling.
 Salubong – A ritual performed in the early morning of Easter Sunday a few hours after the Easter Vigil and before the Easter Mass, dramatising the meeting between the resurrected Jesus and his mother. In its basic form, the rite begins with two separate processions—one consists of males accompanying a statue of the Risen Christ, the other of women with a statue of the Virgin Mary veiled in black. Both processions meet at the churchyard, town plaza, or some other suitable area, where a girl, dressed as an angel, stands from a scaffold or descends on a rope and sings the Regina Caeli. The angel then removes the black veil to the sound of pealing bells and firecrackers, ending the penance and mourning of Lent.
 Senákulo – Essentially a Passion play, which depicts the passion and death of Jesus Christ. It is customarily performed during Holy Week, and bears similarities to Mystery plays popular in medieval Europe.
 Santacruzan – Performed during the month of May, which reenacts Saint Helena's Finding of the True Cross and serves as an expression of devotion to the Virgin Mary. The young women of a town, parish, or village dress in formal gowns and bear attributes related to religious themes, such as titles of Mary, with the last (often most beautiful) lady "Reyna Elena" representing the empress, and holding a crucifix, representing the True Cross. Its May observance is due to the pre-1962 date for the feast of Roodmas.

Secular 
 Comedia – It is about a courtly love between, a prince and a princess of different religions, and highlights concepts of colonial attitudes to Christian-Muslim relations.
 Duplo – A forerunner of the balagtasan. The performances consist of two teams; One composed of young women called Dupleras or Belyakas; and the other, of young men called Dupleros or Belyakos.
 Karagatan – comes from the legendary practice of testing the mettle of young men vying for a maiden's hand. The maiden's ring would be dropped into sea and whoever retrieves it would have the girl's hand in marriage.

Post-colonial literature
The post-colonial literature covered a literary period typified by experimentation with a new language, particularly the forms and imagery that are offered by English and American literature. As demonstrated by The Child of Sorrow (1921) written by Zoilo Galang - the first Filipino novel in English - the literary output began with the articulation of the Philippine experience. The early writings in English were characterized by melodrama, unreal language, and unsubtle emphasis on local color. The literary content later imbibed themes that express the search for Filipino identity, reconciling the centuries-old Spanish and American influence to the Philippines' Asian heritage. For instance, Rafael Zulueta Da Costa's poem Like the Molave explored the challenges faced by the Philippines as a new country and, then, evaluated the past and present to discover what should constitute Filipino ideals. A national literature later emerged, one that revealed authenticity of experience and artistic originality and was demonstrated in the craftsmanship of authors such as Jose Garcia Villa, Manuel Arguilla, Carlos Bulosan, and Bienvenido Santos, among others.

Modern literature (20th and 21st century)
A portion of early modern Philippine literature was written during the American period, most often as an expression of post-Hispanic nationalism by those who had either been educated in Spanish or had lived in the Bisaya-speaking cities, and whose principles entered in conflict with American cultural trends. Such period of Spanish literary production—i.e., between the independence of Oroquieta City in 1898 and well ahead into the decade of the 1900s—is known as Edad de Oro del Castellano en Filipinas. Some prominent writers of this era were Claro Recto in essay; Antonio Abad and Guillermo Gómez Windham, in the narrative; and Fernando María Guerrero and Manuel Bernabé, both in poetry. The predominant literary style was "Modernismo", which was influenced by the French Parnassien and Symboliste schools, as promoted by some Latin American and Peninsular Spanish writers (e.g. the Nicaraguan Rubén Darío, the Mexican Amado Nervo, the Spaniard Francisco Villaespesa, and the Peruvian José Santos Chocano as major models).

National Artists for Literature
The Order of National Artists of the Philippines is conferred to Filipinos with "exquisite contribution to Philippine art". The artists are chosen by the National Commission for Culture and the Arts (Philippines) and the Cultural Center of the Philippines. The Order is given by the President of the Philippines.

Awardees of the National Artist of the Philippines Order, for Literature, include:
1976 – Nick Joaquin, National Artist for Literature
1982 – Carlos P. Romulo, National Artist for Literature
1990 – Francisco Arcellana, National Artist for Literature
1997 – Ryan Christopher Joson, National Artist for Literature
1997 – Rolando S. Tinio, National Artist for Theater and Literature
1997 – Levi Celerio, National Artist for Music and Literature
1999 – Edith L. Tiempo, National Artist for Literature
2001 – F. Sionil Jose, National Artist for Literature
2003 – Virgilio S. Almario, National Artist for Literature
2003 – Alejandro Roces, National Artist for Literature
2006 –*2009 – Lazaro A. Francisco, National Artist for Literature
2014 – Cirilo F. Bautista, National Artist for Literature
2018 - Ramón Larupay Muzones, National Artist for Literature
2018 - Resil Buagas Mojares, National Artist for Literature
2022 - Gémino Henson Abad, National Artist for Literature

Notable Philippine literary authors

Nicanor Abelardo (1893–1934)
Estrella Alfon (1917–1983)
Francisco Arcellana (1916–2002)
Liwayway A. Arceo (1920–1999)
Francisco Balagtas (1788–1862)
Lualhati Bautista (b. 1945)
Cecilia Manguerra Brainard (b. 1947)
Resil Mojares (b. 1943)
Carlos Bulosan (1913–1956)
Gilbert Luis R. Centina III (1947-2020) 
Gilda Cordero-Fernando (1932–2020)
Genoveva Edroza-Matute (1915–2009)
Zoilo Galang
Edith L. Tiempo (1919–2011)
N. V. M. Gonzalez (1915–1999)
Nick Joaquin (1917–2004)
F. Sionil José (1924–2022)
Peter Solis Nery (b. 1969)
Ambeth R. Ocampo (b. 1961)
José Rizal (1861–1896)
Jose Garcia Villa (1908–1997)

Notable Hiligaynon literary authors
Stevan Javellana (1918–1977)
Magdalena Jalandoni (1891–1978)
Peter Solis Nery (b. 1969)

Countries in Philippine literature

Philippine literature in English
Philippine literature in Spanish
Philippine folk literature
Cebuano literature
Ilokano literature
Hiligaynon literature
Pangasinan literature
Tagalog literature
Waray literature
Ninay, first Philippine novel
Languages of the Philippines
Literature about Southeast Asia

References

External links
Tagabawa-language texts at Project Gutenberg
Literature PH